The Tempsford Memorial is a war memorial in the village of Tempsford in Bedfordshire. The village was the home of RAF Tempsford. The memorial commemorates the women who served as secret agents in occupied Europe during the Second World War, the RAF aircrew who transported them, and the personnel from allied secret services who were killed in the war.  The memorial bears the names of 75 known women agents, of whom 29 were arrested, 16 were executed, three died of illnesses while imprisoned, and one committed suicide using a cyanide L-pill before being captured.

Background
Missions by British secret agents to Nazi-occupied Europe during the Second World War were coordinated by the Special Operations Executive, with participation from the UK Secret Intelligence Service (MI6), the Free French Bureau Central de Renseignements et d'Action, the US Office of Strategic Services, and the Soviet NKVD.  Most were flown out by the RAF's Special Duties "moon" squadrons, 138 Squadron and 161 Squadron, from RAF Tempsford, with some operations starting from RAF Tangmere or RAF Harrington.

A book of remembrance at St Peter’s Church in Tempsford lists 623 airmen from the two squadrons killed during the war.  It is believed that 995 agents were dropped into occupied Europe by parachute, 485 were landed by aircraft, and around 575 agents and others were brought back to the UK.

Memorial
The memorial comprises a white Carrara marble column on black granite plinth.  The column and the base bear inscriptions, including a list of the 75 known women agents.  The top of one face of the white column bears a mosaic disc, depicting a white dove and the full moon in a blue sky, made by many local villagers.

The sides of the granite plinth also commemorate the men and women of the two special duties squadrons, No. 138 and No. 161, and the personnel of the secret services from allied nations killed during the war "in the clandestine struggle for freedom and liberty".

The memorial was commissioned by the Tempsford Memorial Trust and created by Ivett & Reed, stonemasons based in Cambridge.  It is erected at the Millennium Sanctuary in Tempsford, near the cemetery of St Peter's church.

The memorial was unveiled by the Prince of Wales on 3 December 2013, who completed the mosaic by inserting the last piece at the centre of the moon, with a flypast by a Lysander in the colours of 161 Squadron.  In attendance was the Lord Lieutenant of Bedfordshire, with Baroness Crawley, Sir John Sawers, delegates from the 12 countries listed, and veterans and relatives of the SOE agents and RAF personnel.

Women commemorated

UK 
 "Angela" (full name not known)
 Yvonne Baseden
 Sonya Butt 
 Muriel Byck (died of illness)
 Blanche Charlet
 Yvonne Cormeau
 Lise de Baissac
 Yvonne Fontaine
 Olga Jackson 
 Marguerite Knight
 Phyllis Latour
 Cécile Lefort (killed in captivity)
 Vera Leigh (executed)
 Mary Lindell
 Eileen Nearne
 Jacqueline Nearne
 Lilian Rolfe (executed)
 Diana Rowden
 Yvonne Rudelatt (died in captivity)
 Sybil Anne Sturrock 
 Violette Szabó (executed)
 Anne-Marie Walters
 Odette Wilen
 Pearl Witherington

France 
 Françine Agazarian
 Julienne Aisner
 Marie-Lou Blanc
 Denise Bloch (executed)
 
 Andrée Borrel (executed)
 Marie-Louise Cloarec (executed)
 Evelyne Clopet (executed)
 Aimée Corge
 Madeleine Damerment (executed)
 Cécile De Marcilly
 Eugénie Djendi (executed)
 Alix d'Unienville
 Marie-Madeleine Fourcade
 Marguerite Gianello
 Eugénie Gruner
 
 Germaine Heim
 Ginette Jullian
 Madeleine Lavigne
 Marie Thérèse Le Chêne
 Pierrette Louin (executed)
 Suzanne Mertzizen (executed)
 Marguerite Petitjean
 Eliane Plewman (executed)
 Danielle Reddé
 Odette Sansom
 Josianne Somers
 Marcelle Somers
 Marie-Christine Studler
Belgium
 Frédérique Dupuich
 Elaine Madden
 Beatrix Terwindt

Chile
 Giliana Gerson

Germany
 Hilde Meisel (cyanide pill)
 Anne Beyer

Ireland
 Mary Herbert
 Patricia O'Sullivan

India
 Noor Inayat Khan (executed)

Netherlands
 
 Josephine Hamilton

New Zealand
 Nancy Wake

Poland
 Krystyna Skarbek-Granville
 Elżbieta Zawacka

Switzerland
 Yolande Beekman (executed)

US 
 Elizabeth Devereux-Rochester
 Virginia Hall

USSR
 Anna Frolova (executed)
 Szyfra Lypszyc (executed)
 Yelena Nikitina
 Emilya Novikova

See also
 List of female SOE agents

References

 Tempsford Memorial Trust
 Prince Charles unveils memorial to wartime women agents, BBC News, 3 December 2013 
 RAF Tempsford Memorial, Ivett & Reed
 Memorial to female WW2 secret agents, Daily Telegraph, 3 December 2013 
 Report: Prince Charles unveils memorial to those who flew secret war missions from RAF Tempsford, Bedford Today, 4 December 2013

Buildings and structures completed in 2013
World War II memorials in England
Monuments and memorials in Bedfordshire
Monuments and memorials to women